In enzymology, a histidine-tRNA ligase is an enzyme that catalyzes the chemical reaction

ATP + L-histidine + tRNAHis  AMP + diphosphate + L-histidyl-tRNAHis

The 3 substrates of this enzyme are ATP, L-histidine, and tRNA(His), whereas its 3 products are AMP, diphosphate, and L-histidyl-tRNA(His).

This enzyme participates in histidine metabolism and aminoacyl-trna biosynthesis.

Nomenclature 

Histidine—tRNA ligase belongs to the family of ligase enzymes, specifically those forming carbon-oxygen bonds in aminoacyl-tRNA and related compounds. The systematic name of this enzyme class is L-histidine:tRNAHis ligase (AMP-forming). Other names in common use include histidyl-tRNA synthetase, histidyl-transfer ribonucleate synthetase, and histidine translase.

See also
 Anti-Jo1

References

 

EC 6.1.1
Enzymes of known structure